TRANSPETROL is a maritime ship owning company specialising in oil tankers.

Fleet
As of 2016, the company's fleet consists of 12 oil tankers in the 45,000 to 111,000 dwt range, and two VLGCs.

As of 15 February 2016, there are 2 additional VLGCs being built and 1 oil tanker.

The average age for all the vessel as of 2016 is 6 years.

References

External links 
 Official Website

Tanker shipping companies